Ellington-Ellis Farm is a historic home and farm complex located near Clayton, Johnston County, North Carolina.  The house was built around 1835, and is a two-story, "T"-plan Greek Revival style heavy timber frame dwelling.  It is sheathed in weatherboard, is flanked by exterior stone end chimneys, and has a low hip roof.  It was remodeled in the 1850s that added a two-room kitchen/dining ell. Also on the property are the contributing smokehouse with a bell tower (1830s), a four-seat ladies' privy (1830s), and a playhouse (1850s).

It was listed on the National Register of Historic Places in 1983.

References

Houses on the National Register of Historic Places in North Carolina
Greek Revival houses in North Carolina
Houses completed in 1835
Houses in Johnston County, North Carolina
National Register of Historic Places in Johnston County, North Carolina